Botsaris or Mpotsaris is a surname. Notable people with the surname include:

 Chris Clark (reporter) (born 1938), American journalist
 Dimitrios Botsaris (1813–1871), Greek soldier and politician
 Katerina Botsari (1820–1872), member of the Souliot Botsaris family
 Kitsos Botsaris (1741–1809), Souliot captain
 Kostas Botsaris (1792–1853), Greek general and politician
 Markos Botsaris (1788–1823), Souliot captain and hero of the Greek War of Independence
 Panagiotis "Notis" Botsaris (1756–1841). Souliote leader and fighter, son of Kitsos Botsaris

See also 
 Gëzim Boçari (b. 1949), Albanian professor of pharmacology and a politician
 Ismail Boçari (1917–2014), Albanian professor of medicine
 Castle of Gjon Boçari, a castle of the 16th and 17th century in Tragjas, Albania

Greek-language surnames